Åsmund Sveen (28 April 1910 31 January 1963) was a Norwegian poet, novelist and literary critic. He was born in Elverum. Among his poetry collections are Andletet from 1932 and Eros syng from 1935. He published the novel Svartjord in 1937. 

In the legal purge in Norway after World War II Sveen was sentenced to several years imprisonment.

References

1910 births
1963 deaths
People from Elverum
20th-century Norwegian poets
Norwegian male poets
Members of Nasjonal Samling
People convicted of treason for Nazi Germany against Norway
20th-century Norwegian novelists
Norwegian male novelists